CKSA-DT (channel 2) is a Citytv-affiliated television station in Lloydminster, a city located on the border of the Canadian provinces of Alberta and Saskatchewan. It is owned by Stingray Radio alongside CTV affiliate CITL-DT (channel 4). Both stations share studios at 50 Street and 51 Avenue on the Alberta side of Lloydminster, while CKSA-DT's transmitter is located near Highway 17 and Township Road 512, near the Saskatchewan provincial line.

History 
From its launch through 2016, CKSA was an affiliate of CBC Television, and was that network's last remaining privately owned affiliate.

Switch to Global 
On May 24, 2016, the Canadian Radio-television and Telecommunications Commission (CRTC) published an application by then-owner Newcap to disaffiliate the station from CBC Television effective August 31 of that year, claiming that the public broadcaster had elected not to renew any of its affiliations with private stations beyond that date. Newcap indicated that it will seek programming from another supplier, without saying whether such alternate programming had been found. On September 1, 2016, CKSA switched to Global. Newcap merged with Stingray Group in 2018.

Following the February 2016 switch of British Columbia outlets CJDC-TV in Dawson Creek and CFTK-TV in Terrace to CTV 2, CKSA-DT was the only privately owned CBC Television affiliate remaining in the system.

Switch to Citytv
In December 2021, CKSA disaffiliated from Global and began airing network programming from Citytv.

CKSA, along with sister CITL, signs off every night, and does not air Citytv's overnight programming, as both stations have the Canadian national anthem "O Canada" played during the sign-off.

Newscasts
As of September 4, 2018, CKSA broadcasts five hours of local news each week. Prime Time Local News airs at 6 p.m. on weekdays and is simulcast with CITL; there is no local news on weekends. Under its previous affiliation with Global, all newscasts from Global Edmonton/CITV-DT were simulcast on CKSA, except for Global News at 5 and the weekday editions of Global National.

The station previously broadcast Newcap News at 5 p.m., followed by Global National at 5:30 p.m. from the start of its Global affiliation until August 31, 2018. On September 4, 2018, the program was expanded to one hour on CKSA, reformatted from a traditional newscast to a news magazine, and re-branded as Prime Time Local News. Global National was only seen on weekends on CKSA preceding Global News Hour at 6 up until its disaffiliation.

Beginning in December 2021, after the switch to Citytv, Prime Time Local News was moved to 6 p.m., and a re-broadcast was added the following morning at 7 a.m. The weeknight 11 p.m. edition, weekend 6 and 11 p.m. editions, as well as the 6 a.m. re-broadcast of CityNews Edmonton is also aired on CKSA.

Transmitters

CKSA was also broadcast on CKSA-TV-3 channel 8 in Wainwright and CKSA-TV-4 channel 12 in Provost, until they ceased operations on August 31, 2011. It was also rebroadcast on CBCS-TV-1 channel 8, an analog rebroadcaster of CKSA in Meadow Lake, Saskatchewan owned by the CBC; this repeater closed on July 31, 2012, as part of the CBC's austerity measures to keep the corporation solvent and in operation.

References

External links

 

KSA-DT
KSA-DT
KSA-DT
Television channels and stations established in 1960
Mass media in Lloydminster
Stingray Group
1960 establishments in Alberta
1960 establishments in Saskatchewan